Colonel Claude Bayfield Stokes  (27 October 1875 – 7 December 1948) was an Indian Army officer and diplomat.  He served in India and was an intelligence officer with Dunsterforce during the First World War.

Stokes was educated at St John's School, Leatherhead and Sandhurst. He was commissioned into the East Kent Regiment on 28 September 1895 and served on the North West Frontier 1897–98. He transferred to the Indian Army 7 October 1897 and in July 1900 he joined the 3rd Skinner's Horse, a unit of the Indian Army.

Stokes was appointed military attaché to Tehran from 1907–1911. During this period he supplied Edward Granville Browne with sensitive intelligence. In 1908 he saved the life of Ali-Akbar Dehkhoda, the Iranian linguist and  Hassan Taqizadeh (a subsequent President of Iran), when he allowed him to take refuge in the British Legation compound.
He commanded the first detachment of the British Army to go to Baku arriving on 4 August 1918.

He was appointed British High Commissioner in Transcaucasia, based in the Georgian capital of Tiflis, from 1920 to 1921.

He retired from the Indian Army 1 October 1922.

From 1931–1940 he was British Vice consul in Nice, France.

Family life
Stokes had married Olga Postovsky in Turkey in the early 1920s and they had a daughter. Stokes died at 22B Roland Gardens in South Kensington London on 7 December 1948.

References

1875 births
1948 deaths
Graduates of the Royal Military College, Sandhurst
Buffs (Royal East Kent Regiment) officers
British Indian Army officers
Indian Army personnel of World War I
Companions of the Order of the Indian Empire
Companions of the Distinguished Service Order
Officers of the Order of the British Empire
British diplomats
People educated at St John's School, Leatherhead
British military attachés
Military personnel of British India
British people in colonial India